Hymenobacter glaciei is a species of bacteria first isolated from Victoria Upper Glacier, Antarctica on basal ice. It is a psychrotolerant, heterotrophic aerobe. It is notable for the prevalence of horizontal gene transfers in its evolution, possibly due to dormancy because of its habitat.

References

Further reading

Reddy, Gundlapally SN, and Ferran Garcia-Pichel. "Description of Hymenobacter arizonensis sp. nov. from the southwestern arid lands of the United States of America." Antonie van Leeuwenhoek 103.2 (2013): 321–330.
Jin, Long, et al. "Hymenobacter ruber sp. nov., isolated from grass soil."International Journal of Systematic and Evolutionary Microbiology 64.Pt 3 (2014): 979-983.
Kang, Ji Young, et al. "Hymenobacter koreensis sp. nov. and Hymenobacter saemangeumensis sp. nov., isolated from estuarine water." International Journal of Systematic and Evolutionary Microbiology 63.Pt 12 (2013): 4568–4573.
Srinivasan, Sathiyaraj, et al. "Hymenobacter humi sp. nov., a bacterium isolated from soil." Antonie van Leeuwenhoek (2015): 1–9.

External links

LPSN

glaciei
Bacteria described in 2011